The racquetball competition at the 1985 World Games took place from July 25 to August 4 in London, England. Thirty-eight players competed at David Lloyd's Slazenger Racquet Club.

In the men's competition, American Ed Andrews was the defending World Games gold medalist, winning the first competition in 1981, and Canadian Ross Harvey was the reigning World Champion, winning that title in 1984. However, neither player made it to the finals.

Instead, the men's final was between two 20-year-olds, with American Andy Roberts defeating Canadian Roger Harripersad, 15-11, 15-10.

On the women's side, Cindy Baxter of the USA won her second World Games gold medal in London defeating Canadian Carol Dupuy in the final, 15-4, 15-9. Crystal Fried of Canada finished third, as Mary Dee, the other American in the competition, injured her back during the tournament.

Men's competition

Women's competition

Team results

References

1985
1985 in racquetball
1985 World Games
Racquetball in the United Kingdom
Racquetball at multi-sport events